Eager is a children's science-fiction novel written by Helen Fox, and first published in 2003. Eager is the name of a self-aware robot in a futuristic society controlled by a company called LifeCorp. Eager was shortlisted for the West Sussex Children's Book Award 2005–2006.

Plot summary
The plot is set in Britain at the end of the 21st Century and revolves around an experimental type of robot that can think for itself, EGR3 (called Eager). Eager learns by experience as a human does, is intellectually curious, and capable of emotion. He can feel wonder, excitement, and loss. His inventor sends him as an assistant to an old-fashioned robot, Grumps, who acts as a butler to the Bell family. Though much-loved, Grumps is running down and can no longer be repaired.

Mr. Bell works for the all-powerful technocratic corporation, LifeCorp, which supplies the robots which cater to every human need. His children Gavin and Fleur learn of an underground group that opposes LifeCorp, and there is a danger of a robot rebellion brewing. The ultra-high-tech, eerily human BDC4 robots are behaving suspiciously and the Bell children and Eager are drawn into a great adventure. Eager's extraordinary abilities are tested to the limit and he tries to find out the answer to the question:  what does it mean to be alive?

Themes
Questions of where technology may be heading, what constitutes life and death, and the morality of creating self-aware machines to serve, or sometimes replace, humans, are raised.  Eager is the first of three novels

Reception
Kirkus Reviews describe Eager as "The Jetsons in a lightweight dystopia." but also "While Eager’s adventure isn’t thrilling, his discoveries about life, formed through amusing conversations with virtual reality Socrates, are thought-provoking."  A review posted to The Guardian.com called it "A very funny book and at one point a lesson in paranoia against technology."

Sequels
Two sequels were published Nephew (2005) and Eager and the Mermaid'' (2007).

References

External links

Review of Eager 
Children's Reviews of Eager

2003 British novels
2003 children's books
2003 science fiction novels
British children's novels
British science fiction novels
Children's science fiction novels
Novels about robots
Works set in the 2090s
Novels set in the 21st century
Hodder & Stoughton books